Dolphin Cruise Line was a cruise line that owned a fleet of ships such as the , ,  and SS IslandBreeze. In 1997, it was bought out by Premier Cruise Line, and the remaining 3 ships kept their names, but were painted in Premier Cruise Line's livery.

Former Fleet

References

External links
 Postcards Of The Dolphin Cruise Lines Fleet

Defunct cruise lines
Companies disestablished in 1997